Ana Paula Godinez Gonzalez (born November 26, 1999) is a Canadian freestyle wrestler. She won the gold medal in the women's 62 kg event at the 2022 Pan American Wrestling Championships held in Acapulco, Mexico. She won the silver medal in the women's 62 kg event at the 2022 Commonwealth Games held in Birmingham, England.

Career 

She won one of the bronze medals in the women's 62 kg event at the 2019 World Junior Wrestling Championships held in Tallinn, Estonia. A month later, she competed in the women's 62 kg event at the 2019 World Wrestling Championships held in Nur-Sultan, Kazakhstan.

She won the silver medal in her event at the 2021 Poland Open held in Warsaw, Poland. She competed in the women's 62 kg event at the 2021 World Wrestling Championships held in Oslo, Norway. A month later, she won the gold medal in her event at the 2021 U23 World Wrestling Championships held in Belgrade, Serbia.

She lost her bronze medal match in the 62kg event at the 2022 World Wrestling Championships held in Belgrade, Serbia. A month later, she won one of the bronze medals in her event at the 2022 U23 World Wrestling Championships held in Pontevedra, Spain.

She won the gold medal in her event at the Grand Prix de France Henri Deglane 2023 held in Nice, France.

Personal life 

Her sister Karla Godinez is also a competitive wrestler.

Achievements

References

External links 
 

Living people
1999 births
Place of birth missing (living people)
Canadian female sport wrestlers
Pan American Wrestling Championships medalists
Wrestlers at the 2022 Commonwealth Games
Commonwealth Games silver medallists for Canada
Commonwealth Games medallists in wrestling
Canadian people of Mexican descent
21st-century Canadian women
Medallists at the 2022 Commonwealth Games